Sainte-Marie is a city in the province of Quebec, Canada. It is the seat of the Municipalité régionale de la Nouvelle-Beauce, in Chaudière-Appalaches. The population was 13,134 as of the Canada 2021 Census, and was 95.7% French-speaking as of 2021.

History
The seigneurie of Sainte-Marie-de-la-Nouvelle-Beauce was granted to Thomas-Jacques Taschereau in 1736. He chose the name in honour of his wife, Marie-Claire de Fleury de La Gorgendière. The religious parish was founded in 1737 and the municipality in 1845.

The territory of Sainte-Marie was divided on several occasions, as population increased, in order to found neighbouring communities: Saint-Bernard, Saint-Isidore, Saint-Maxime-de-Scott (now Scott), Sainte-Marguerite, Sainte-Hénédine, Saint-Sylvestre, Saint-Elzéar, Saint-Séverin, Saints-Anges, and Vallée-Jonction.

In 1913, the territory was split again, following the detachment of the village (urban part of the territory) from the parish municipality (rural part). In 1958, the village was constituted as a city and in 1959, Sainte-Marie-de-la-Nouvelle-Beauce was renamed as Sainte-Marie. In 1978, the city and the parish municipality governments amalgamated.

Demographics 

Notable people 
 Marius Barbeau, ethnographer
 Elzéar-Henri Juchereau Duchesnay, Canadian politician
 Ernest Savard, hockey executive, head coach, general manager (Montreal Canadiens)
 Nycole Turmel, Canadian politician
 Henri-Jules Juchereau Duchesnay, Canadian politician
 Gabriel-Elzéar Taschereau, Quebec politician
 Elzéar-Alexandre Taschereau, clergyman
 Henri Elzéar Taschereau, lawyer
 Jean-Thomas Taschereau, lawyer
 Joseph-André Taschereau, judge
 Pierre-Elzéar Taschereau, Canadian politician
 Thomas Linière Taschereau, Canadian politician
 Mario Gosselin, NASCAR driver
 Thomas Chabot, ice hockey defenceman for the NHL’s Ottawa Senators

Partner cities
 Pont-du-Château, Auvergne, France

References

External links 

 
Commission de toponymie du Québec
Ministère des Affaires municipales, des Régions et de l'Occupation du territoire

 
Cities and towns in Quebec